Here Today may refer to:

Music
 Here Today (David Grisman album), 1983
 Here Today (Violent Apathy album), 1983
 "Here Today" (The Beach Boys song), 1966
 "Here Today" (Paul McCartney song), 1982
 Here Today, early name of Vigil (band)

Other uses
 Here Today (novel), a 2004 novel by Ann M. Martin
Here Today, a 1932 play by George Oppenheimer
 "Here Today" (The West Wing), an episode of The West Wing
 Here Today (film), a 2021 comedy-drama film

See also